James Beatty may refer to:
 Jim Beatty (born 1934), American track and field athlete and politician
 Jim Beatty (musician), American jazz musician
 James Beatty (engineer) (1820–1856), Irish railway engineer
 James Beatty (Minnesota pioneer) (1817–1892), Minnesota pioneer and territorial legislator
 James H. Beatty (1836–1927), U.S. federal judge
 James Harry Beatty (1890–1966), Canadian politician

See also
James Beattie (disambiguation)
James Beaty (disambiguation)